In pharmacology, pleiotropy includes all of a drug's actions other than those for which the agent was specifically developed. It may include adverse effects which are detrimental ones, but is often used to denote additional beneficial effects.

For example, statins are HMG-CoA reductase inhibitors that primarily act by decreasing cholesterol synthesis, but which are believed to have other beneficial effects, including acting as antioxidants and stabilizing atherosclerotic plaques. Steroid drugs, such as prednisone and prednisolone, have pleiotropic effects, including systemic ones, for the same reason that endogenous steroid hormones do too: cells throughout the body have receptors that can respond to them, because the endogenous ones are endocrine messengers.

See also
Adverse effect
Pleiotropy in genetics

References

Pharmacology